The 33rd (Lancashire and Cheshire) Signal Regiment was a British Territorial Army regiment of the Royal Corps of Signals.

History 
The regiment was originally a TAVR II (Territorial and Army Volunteer Reserve) unit created due to defence cuts, being formed on 1 April 1967 at Huyton, near Liverpool and consisting of four squadrons:

HQ Squadron
42 (East Lancashire) Signal Squadron – successor to the 42nd (Lancashire and Cheshire) Signal Regiment
59 (West Lancashire) Signal Squadron – successor to the 59th Signal Regiment
80 (Cheshire Yeomanry) Signal Squadron – successor to the 80th Signal Regiment

In 1999, during the reforms implemented due to the Strategic Defence Review, the squadron subtitles, with the exception of 80 Squadron, were changed. They became:

55 (Merseyside) HQ Squadron
42 (City of Manchester) Signal Squadron
59 (City of Liverpool) Signal Squadron

Disbandment

As a result of the strategic review of reserves it was announced on 28 April 2009 that the regiment was to be disbanded.

It was reduced to a single 33 Lancashire Signal Squadron, first in 32 Signal Regiment, then from 2014 in 37 Signal Regiment under the Army 2020 reorganisation. It continues to maintain 842 Signal Troop at Rusholme, Manchester.

References

External links 
Ministry of Defence website

Regiments of the Royal Corps of Signals
Military units and formations established in 1967
Military units and formations in Lancashire
Military units and formations in Liverpool
Military units and formations in Cheshire